Session may refer to:

Bureaucracy and law
Session (parliamentary procedure)
Session (Presbyterian), a governing body in Presbyterian polity
Court of Session, the supreme civil court of Scotland
Executive session, a portion of the United States Senate's daily session
Legislative session

Computing
Session (computer science), a semi-permanent interactive information exchange between communicating devices
Session (web analytics), in web analytics, measuring a continuous period of browsing of a website by a particular user
Session, a group of process groups in POSIX-conformant operating systems
CD sessions, how data is laid out on an optical disc
Login session
Session (software), a cross-platform end-to-end encrypted instant messaging application.

Music

Contexts
Jam session, where musicians gather and play
Pub session, playing music in a public house
Recording session, where musicians record music together

Works

Session (Ned's Atomic Dustbin album), a 2004 album by Ned's Atomic Dustbin
"Session", an instrumental song by Linkin Park from their 2003 album Meteora
"Session", a song by The Offspring from their 1992 album Ignition
"Session", a song by Tyler the Creator from the album Bastard

Other uses in music
CD sessions, the layout of data on a compact disc or DVD
Session musician, musicians available for hire

Other uses
Academic term, sometimes called a "session"
Session of Christ, the Christian doctrine of Jesus' place in heaven
Session (video game), a skateboarding video game planned for 2019
Session, a 2018 short film directed by Buğra Mert Alkayalar

See also
Cession
Court of Session (disambiguation)
Sessions (disambiguation)